Dozen or dozens are groupings of twelve.

Dozen or Dozens may also refer to:
 The Dozens, a contest common among African Americans where participants insult each other
 "The Dozens" (Black-ish), an episode of the television series Black-ish

See also
Baker's dozen (disambiguation)
Dirty Dozen (disambiguation)